Roy Rogers (born Leonard Franklin Slye; November 5, 1911 – July 6, 1998) was an American singer, actor, and television host. Following early work under his given name, first as co-founder of the Sons of the Pioneers and then as an actor, the rebranded Rogers then became one of the most popular Western stars of his era. Known as the "King of the Cowboys", he appeared in over 100 films and numerous radio and television episodes of The Roy Rogers Show. In many of his films and television episodes, he appeared with his wife, Dale Evans; his Golden Palomino, Trigger; and his German Shepherd, Bullet. His show was broadcast on radio for nine years and then on television from 1951 through 1957. His early roles were uncredited parts in films by fellow cowboy singing star Gene Autry and his productions usually featured a sidekick, often Pat Brady, Andy Devine, George "Gabby" Hayes, or Smiley Burnette. In his later years, he lent his name to the franchise chain of Roy Rogers Restaurants.

Life and career

Early life
Rogers was born Leonard Franklin Slye, the son of Mattie (née Womack) and Andrew "Andy" Slye in Cincinnati, Ohio. The family lived in a tenement on 2nd Street, where Riverfront Stadium was later constructed. (Rogers later joked that he was born at second base.) Len had three sisters: Kathleen, Mary, and Cleda. Dissatisfied with his job and city life, Andy and his brother Will built a  houseboat from salvage lumber, and in July 1912 the Slye family traveled down the Scioto River towards Portsmouth. Desiring a more stable existence in Portsmouth, they purchased land on which they planned to build a house, but instead the Great Flood of 1913 enabled them to move the houseboat onto their property and continue living in it on dry land.

Andy soon realized that the farm alone would not provide sufficient income for his family, so he took a job at a Portsmouth shoe factory, living in Portsmouth during the week and returning home on weekends, bearing gifts following paydays. A notable gift was a horse on which young Len learned the basics of horsemanship. Living on the farm with no radio, the family made their own entertainment. On Saturday nights, they often invited neighbors over for square dances, during which Len would sing, play mandolin, and call the square dances. He also learned to yodel during this time, and with his mother they would use different yodels to communicate with each other across distances on the farm.

Len attended high school in McDermott, Ohio, but after he completed his second year there, his family returned to Cincinnati, where his father worked at another shoe factory. Realizing that his family needed his financial help, Len quit school and joined his father at the factory. He tried to attend night school, but after being ridiculed for falling asleep in class, he quit school and never returned.

By 1929, after his older sister Mary and her husband had moved to Lawndale, California, Len and his father quit their factory jobs, packed up their 1923 Dodge, and drove the family to California to visit Mary. They stayed for four months before returning to Ohio. Soon after returning, Len had the opportunity to travel again to California with Mary's father-in-law, and the rest of the family followed in the spring of 1930. The Slye family rented a small house near Mary, and Len and his father found employment driving gravel trucks for a highway construction project.

In spring 1931, after the construction company went bankrupt, Len traveled to Tulare, California, where he found work picking peaches for Del Monte. During this time, he lived in a labor camp similar to those depicted in John Steinbeck's novel The Grapes of Wrath. The economic hardship of the Great Depression was just as severe in California as it was in Ohio.

Music career
After 19-year-old Len's return to Lawndale, his sister Mary suggested that he audition for the Midnight Frolic radio program, which was broadcast over KMCS in Inglewood. A few nights later, wearing a Western shirt that Mary had made for him, he overcame his shyness and appeared on the program playing guitar, singing, and yodeling. A few days later, he was asked to join a local country music group, the Rocky Mountaineers. He accepted the group's offer and became a member in August 1931.

By September 1931, Len hired the Canadian-born Bob Nolan, who answered the group's classified ad in the Los Angeles Herald-Examiner that read, "Yodeler for old-time act, to travel. Tenor preferred." Nolan stayed with the group only a short time, but Len and he stayed in touch. Nolan was replaced by Tim Spencer.

In the spring of 1932, Len, Spencer, and another singer, Slumber Nichols, left the Rocky Mountaineers to form a trio, which soon failed. Throughout that year, Len and Spencer moved through a series of short-lived groups, including the International Cowboys and the O-Bar-O Cowboys. When Spencer left the O-Bar-O Cowboys to take a break from music, Len joined Jack LeFevre and His Texas Outlaws, who were a popular act on a local Los Angeles radio station.

In early 1933, Len, Nolan, and Spencer formed the Pioneers Trio, with Slye on guitar, Nolan on string bass, and Spencer as lead vocalist. They rehearsed for weeks refining their vocal harmonies. During this time, Len continued to work with his radio singing group, while Spencer and Nolan began writing songs for the trio. In early 1934, the fiddle player Hugh Farr joined the group, adding a bass voice to their vocal arrangements. Later that year, the Pioneers Trio became the Sons of the Pioneers when a radio station announcer changed their name because he felt they were too young to be pioneers. The name was received well and fit the group, which was no longer a trio.

By summer 1934, the popularity and fame of the Sons of the Pioneers extended beyond the Los Angeles area and quickly spread across the country through short syndicated radio segments that were later rebroadcast across the United States. The Sons of the Pioneers signed a recording contract with the newly founded Decca label and made their first commercial recording on August 8, 1934. One of the first songs recorded during that first session was "Tumbling Tumbleweeds", written by Bob Nolan. Over the next two years, the Sons of the Pioneers recorded 32 songs for Decca, including the classic "Cool Water".

Film career

From his first film appearance in 1935, Len worked steadily in Western films, including a large supporting role as a singing cowboy while still billed as Leonard Slye in a Gene Autry movie. In 1938, Autry demanded more money for his work, so there was a competition for a new singing cowboy (that they could pay less). Many singers sought the job, including Willie Phelps of the Phelps brothers, who appeared in early Western movies. Len ended up winning the contest and was given the stage name Roy Rogers by Republic Pictures, suggesting the western-sounding name Roy and combining it with the surname of the popular western comic entertainer Will Rogers. 

He was assigned the leading role in Under Western Stars. He became a matinee idol, a competitor with Autry as the nation's favorite singing cowboy. In addition to his own movies, he played a supporting role in the John Wayne classic Dark Command (1940), which also featured one of his future sidekicks, George "Gabby" Hayes. He became a major box-office attraction. Unlike other stars, the vast majority of his leading roles allowed him to play a character with his own name, in the manner of Autry.

In the Motion Picture Herald Top Ten Money-Making Western Stars poll, Rogers was listed for 16 consecutive years, from 1939 to 1954, holding first place from 1943 to 1954 until the poll ceased. He appeared in the similar BoxOffice poll from 1938 to 1955, holding first place from 1943 to 1952. In the final three years of that poll, he was second only to Randolph Scott. These two polls are only an indication of the popularity of series stars, but Rogers also appeared in the Top Ten Money Making Stars Poll of all films in 1945 and 1946.

Rogers was an idol for many children through his films and television shows. Most of his postwar films were in Trucolor during an era when almost all other B westerns were black and white. Some of his movies would segue into animal adventures, in which his horse, Trigger, would go off on his own for a while with the camera following him.

With money from Rogers' films and from his public appearances going to Republic Pictures, he brought a clause into his 1940 contract with the studio where he would have the right to his likeness, voice, and name for merchandising. There were Roy Rogers action figures, cowboy adventure novels, and playsets, as well as a comic strip, a long-lived Dell Comics comic book series (Roy Rogers Comics) written by Gaylord Du Bois, and a variety of marketing successes. Rogers was second only to Walt Disney in the number of items featuring his name.

The Sons of the Pioneers continued their popularity and have not stopped performing from the time Rogers started the group, replacing members as they retired or died (all original members are dead). Although he was no longer an active member, they often appeared as his backup group in films, radio, and television, and he would occasionally appear with them in performances up until his death.

He met Dale Evans in 1944 when they were cast in a film together. They were well known as advocates for adoption and as founders and operators of children's charities. They adopted several children. Both were outspoken Christians throughout their marriage. Beginning in 1949, they were part of the Hollywood Christian Group, founded by their friend, Louis Evans, Jr., the organizing pastor of Bel Air Church. The group met in Henrietta Mears's home and later in the home of Evans and Colleen Townsend, after their marriage. Billy Graham and Jane Russell were also part of this group. In 1956, the Hollywood Christian Group became Bel Air Church. 

In Apple Valley, California, where they later made their home, streets, highways, and civic buildings have been named after them in recognition of their efforts on behalf of homeless and handicapped children. Rogers was also an active Freemason and a Shriner and was noted for his support of their charities.

Rogers and Evans' famous theme song, "Happy Trails", was written by Evans; they sang it as a duet to sign off their television show. In fall 1962, they cohosted a comedy-Western-variety program, The Roy Rogers and Dale Evans Show, aired on ABC. It was cancelled after three months, losing in the ratings to The Jackie Gleason Show on CBS. He also made numerous cameo or guest appearances on other popular television shows, starring as himself or other cowboy-type characters, such as in an episode of Wonder Woman called "The Bushwackers".

Rogers owned a Hollywood production company, which produced his own series. It also filmed other undertakings, including the 1955–1956 CBS Western series Brave Eagle, starring Keith Larsen as a young, peaceful Cheyenne chief, Kim Winona as Morning Star, his romantic interest, and the Hopi Indian Anthony Numkena as Keena, Brave Eagle's foster son.

In 1968, Rogers licensed his name to the Marriott Corporation, which converted its Hot Shoppes restaurants into Roy Rogers Restaurants, with which he otherwise had no involvement.

Rogers returned to Lubbock in 1970 to headline the Texas Tech University Intercollegiate Rodeo with Evans. In 1975, his last motion picture, Macintosh and T.J. was filmed at the 6666 Ranch in King County, 90 miles east of Lubbock and near the O-
Bar-O Ranch in Kent County.

Personal life

In 1932, a palomino colt foaled in California was named "Golden Cloud"; when Rogers acquired him, he renamed him Trigger. Rogers also owned a thoroughbred racehorse named Triggairo, that won 13 career races, including the 1975 El Encino Stakes at Santa Anita Park.

In 1932, Rogers met an admirer named Lucile Ascolese. They were married in 1933 by a justice of the peace in Los Angeles; the marriage failed, and the couple divorced in 1936. 

Rogers had been on tour with the O-Bar-O Cowboys in June 1933 and while they were performing in Roswell, New Mexico, a caller to a radio station, Grace Arline Wilkins, promised Rogers that she would bake him a pie if he sang "The Swiss Yodel". They were married in Roswell on June 11, 1936, having corresponded since their first meeting. In 1941, the couple adopted a daughter, Cheryl Darlene. Two years later, Grace gave birth to daughter Linda Lou. A son, Roy, Jr. ("Dusty"), was born in 1946; Grace died of complications from the birth a few days later, on November 3.

Rogers met Dale Evans in 1944 when they were cast in a film together. They fell in love soon after Grace's death, and Rogers proposed to her during a rodeo at Chicago Stadium. They married on New Year's Eve in 1947 at the Flying L Ranch in Davis, Oklahoma, where they had filmed Home in Oklahoma a few months earlier. Together they had a child and adopted four more: Robin Elizabeth, who had Down syndrome and died of complications with mumps shortly before her second birthday; three adopted daughters, Mimi, Dodie, and Debbie; and one adopted son, Sandy. Evans wrote about the loss of their daughter Robin in her book Angel Unaware. Rogers and Evans remained married until his death.

In 1955, Rogers and Evans purchased a 168-acre (68 ha) ranch near Chatsworth, California, complete with a hilltop ranch house, expanding it to 300 acres (121 ha). 

After their daughter Debbie was killed in a church bus accident in 1964, they moved to the 67-acre (27 ha) Double R Bar Ranch in Apple Valley, California.

Rogers was a Freemason and a member of Hollywood (California) Lodge No. 355, the Scottish Rite Valley of Los Angeles, and Al Malaikah Shrine Temple. He was also a pilot and the owner of a Cessna Bobcat.

Rogers supported Barry Goldwater in the 1964 United States presidential election.

Death
Rogers died of congestive heart failure on July 6, 1998, aged 86, in Apple Valley, California. He was buried at Sunset Hills Memorial Park in Apple Valley, as was his wife Dale Evans three years later.

Honors and awards

On February 8, 1960, Rogers was honored with three stars on the Hollywood Walk of Fame: for Motion Pictures at 1752 Vine Street, for Television at 1620 Vine Street, and for Radio at 1733 Vine Street. In 1983 he was awarded the Golden Boot Award,
and in 1996 he received the Golden Boot Founder's Award.

In 1967, Rogers, with Choctaw blood on his mother's side, was named outstanding Indian citizen of the year by a group of Western tribes.

In 1976, Rogers and Evans were inducted into the Western Performers Hall of Fame at the National Cowboy & Western Heritage Museum in Oklahoma City, Oklahoma, and in 1995 he was inducted again as a founding member of the Sons of the Pioneers.

Rogers received recognition from the State of Arkansas, appointed by the governor of that state with an Arkansas Traveler certificate.

Rogers was also twice elected to the Country Music Hall of Fame, first as a member of the Sons of the Pioneers in 1980, and again as a soloist in 1988. As of August 2022, he was the only person elected to the Country Music Hall of Fame twice. In 2001, a Golden Palm Star on the Palm Springs, California, Walk of Stars was dedicated to him and Dale Evans.

Rogers' cultural influence is reflected in numerous songs, including "If I Had a Boat" by Lyle Lovett, "Roy Rogers" by Elton John on his 1973 album Goodbye Yellow Brick Road, and "Should've Been a Cowboy" by Toby Keith. Rogers himself makes an appearance in the music video for the song "Heroes and Friends" by Randy Travis. Rogers is referenced in numerous films, including Die Hard (1988) in which the Bruce Willis character John McClane used the pseudonym "Roy" and remarks, "I was always kinda partial to Roy Rogers actually." In the television series American Dad!, the character Roger uses "Roy Rogers" as a pseudonym in the episode "Roy Rogers McFreely". In the movie City Slickers, the Jack Palance character Curly, sings the song "Tumbling Tumbleweeds" while the Billy Crystal character Mitch is playing the harmonica.

Filmography 

 Slightly Static (1935) as member of Sons of the Pioneers 
 The Old Homestead (1935) as Len, member of Sons of the Pioneers 
 Way Up Thar (1935) as band member 
 Gallant Defender (1935) as guitar-playing Nester 
 The Mysterious Avenger (1936) as musician Len 
 Song of the Saddle (1936) as guitarist with Sons of the Pioneers 
 When I Yoo Hoo (1936) as vocal 
 Rhythm on the Range (1936) as Leonard with Sons of the Pioneers 
 California Mail (1936) as square dance caller 
 The Big Show (1936) as guitarist with Sons of the Pioneers 
 The Old Corral (1936) as Buck O'Keefe 
 Egghead Rides Again (1937) as yodeling specialty 
 The Old Wyoming Trail (1937) as guitar player, singer, cowhand Len 
 Wild Horse Rodeo (1937) as singer 
 The Old Barn Dance (1938) as singer 
 Under Western Stars (1938) as himself
 The Isle of Pingo Pongo (1938) as speciality yodeling 
 Billy the Kid Returns (1938) as Roy Rogers and Billy the Kid
 A Feud There Was (1938) as Elmer Fudd 
 Come On, Rangers (1938) as himself
 Shine On, Harvest Moon (1938) as himself
 Rough Riders' Round-up (1939) as himself
 Southward Ho (1939) as Roy
 Frontier Pony Express (1939) as Roy Rogers, Pony Express rider
 In Old Caliente (1939) as himself
 Wall Street Cowboy (1939) as himself
 The Arizona Kid (1939) as himself
 Jeepers Creepers (1939) as Sheriff Roy Rogers
 Saga of Death Valley (1939) as himself
 Days of Jesse James (1939) as himself
 Dark Command (1940) as Fletch McCloud
 Young Buffalo Bill (1940) as Bill Cody
 The Carson City Kid (1940) as Carson City Kid
 The Ranger and the Lady (1940) as Texas Ranger Captain Roy Colt
 Colorado (1940) as Lieutenant Jerry Burke
 Young Bill Hickok (1940) as Bill Hickok
 The Border Legion (1940) as Dr. Stephen Kellogg, aka Steve Kells
 Robin Hood of the Pecos (1941) as Vance Corbin
 Arkansas Judge (1941) as Tom Martel
 In Old Cheyenne (1941) as Steve Blane
 Sheriff of Tombstone (1941) as Brett Starr
 Nevada City (1941) as Jeff Connors
 Bad Man of Deadwood (1941) as Brett Starr aka Bill Brady
 Jesse James at Bay (1941) as Jesse James and Clint Burns
 Red River Valley (1941) as himself
 Man from Cheyenne (1942) as himself
 South of Santa Fe (1942) as himself
 Sunset on the Desert (1942) as Roy Rogers and Bill Sloan
 Romance on the Range (1942) as himself
 Sons of the Pioneers (1942) as himself
 Sunset Serenade (1942) as himself
 Heart of the Golden West (1942) as himself
 Ridin' Down the Canyon (1942) as himself
 Idaho (1943) as himself
 King of the Cowboys (1943) as himself
 Song of Texas (1943) as himself
 Silver Spurs (1943) as himself
 The Man from Music Mountain (1943) as himself
 Hands Across the Border (1944) as himself
 Cowboy and the Senorita (1944) as himself
 The Yellow Rose of Texas (1944) as himself
 Song of Nevada (1944) as himself
 San Fernando Valley (1944) as himself
 Lights of Old Santa Fe (1944) as himself
 Brazil (1944) as himself
 Hollywood Canteen (1944) as himself
 Lake Placid Serenade (1944) as himself
 Utah (1945) as himself
 Bells of Rosarita (1945) as himself
 The Man from Oklahoma (1945) as himself 
 Along the Navajo Trail (1945) as himself
 Sunset in El Dorado (1945) as himself
 Don't Fence Me In (1945) as himself
 Song of Arizona (1946) as himself
 Rainbow Over Texas (1946) as himself
 My Pal Trigger (1946) as himself
 Under Nevada Skies (1946) as himself
 Roll on Texas Moon (1946) as himself
 Home in Oklahoma (1946) as himself
 Out California Way (1946) as himself
 Heldorado (1946) as Nevada State Ranger Roy Rogers
 Apache Rose (1947) as himself
 Hit Parade of 1947 (1947) as himself
 Bells of San Angelo (1947) as himself
 Springtime in the Sierras (1947) as himself
 On the Old Spanish Trail (1947) as himself
 The Gay Ranchero (1948) as himself
 Under California Stars (1948) as himself
 Melody Time (1948) as himself
 Eyes of Texas (1948) as himself
 Night Time in Nevada (1948) as himself
 Grand Canyon Trail (1948) as himself
 The Far Frontier (1948) as himself
 Susanna Pass (1949) as himself
 Down Dakota Way (1949) as himself
 The Golden Stallion (1949) as himself
 Bells of Coronado (1950) as himself
 Twilight in the Sierras (1950) as State Parole Officer Roy Rogers
 Trigger, Jr. (1950) as himself
 Sunset in the West (1950) as himself
 North of the Great Divide (1950) as himself
 Trail of Robin Hood (1950) as himself
 Spoilers of the Plains (1951) as himself
 Heart of the Rockies (1951) as himself
 In Old Amarillo (1951) as himself
 South of Caliente (1951) as himself
 Pals of the Golden West (1951) as Border Patrolman Roy Rogers
 Son of Paleface (1952) as Roy Barton
 Alias Jesse James (1959) as himself (uncredited)
 Mackintosh and T.J. (1975) as Mackintosh
 Wonder Woman (1977) as J.P. Hadley, season 1, episode 12
 The Muppet Show (1979) as himself
 The Fall Guy (1983 and 1984) as himself

Box office ranking
For a number of years exhibitors voted Rogers among the most popular stars in the country:
1942 – 2nd most popular Western star (following Gene Autry)
1943 – most popular Western star
1944 – 24th most popular star in the U.S.; most popular Western star
1945 – most popular Western star; 10th most popular star
1946 – 10th most popular star in the US; most popular Western star
1947 – 12th most popular star in the US; most popular Western star
1948 – 17th most popular star in the US; most popular Western star
1949 – 18th most popular star in the US; most popular Western star
1950 – 19th (US); most popular Western star
1951 – most popular Western star
1952 – most popular Western star (for the 10th year in a row)

Discography

Charted albums

Charted singles

 A"Hoppy, Gene and Me" also peaked at number 65 on the Billboard Hot 100 and number 38 on the RPM Adult Contemporary Tracks chart in Canada.

Music videos

Popular songs recorded by Rogers

 "Don't Fence Me In"
 "Hold That Critter Down"
 "Little White Cross on the Hill"
 "One More Ride"
 "Ride Ranger Ride"
 "That Pioneer Mother of Mine"
 "Tumbling Tumbleweeds"
 "Way Out There" (singing and yodeling)
 "Why, Oh Why, Did I Ever Leave Wyoming?"
 "Hold On Partner" (duet with Clint Black)
 "Happy Trails"
 "The Bible Tells Me So"

See also

 Dale Evans
 Trigger (horse)
 Buttermilk (horse)
 Smiley Burnette
 Pat Brady
 Andy Devine
 George "Gabby" Hayes
 Roy Rogers Restaurants
 Roy Rogers cocktail
 Earl W. Bascom, cowboy artist who worked with Rogers

References
Notes

Bibliography

External links

 
 
 Annual Roy Rogers Festival
 Profile at Turner Classic Movies
 
 Country Music Hall of Fame
 "Cinchset" Roy Rogers Show filming at the Golden Oak Ranch

 
1911 births
1998 deaths
20th-century American male actors
20th-century American singers
20th-century American male singers
American Freemasons
American Presbyterians
American country singer-songwriters
American male film actors
American male singer-songwriters
American male television actors
American racehorse owners and breeders
Bell Records artists
California Republicans
Capitol Records artists
Country Music Hall of Fame inductees
Country musicians from Ohio
Decca Records artists
Male Western (genre) film actors
Male actors from Cincinnati
Musicians from Cincinnati
Ohio Republicans
People from Apple Valley, California
People from Lucasville, Ohio
People from Portsmouth, Ohio
RCA Victor artists
Singer-songwriters from Ohio
Singing cowboys
Sons of the Pioneers members
Vocalion Records artists
Western (genre) television actors
Yodelers
Singer-songwriters from California